A Mann & A Woman is an album by American jazz flautist Herbie Mann and vocalist Tamiko Jones released on the Atlantic label in 1967.

Reception

AllMusic rated the album 4 stars.

Track listing
 "A Man and a Woman" (Francis Lai, Pierre Barouh, Jerry Keller) – 2:32
 "Day Tripper" (John Lennon, Paul McCartney) – 2:37
 "Come Back to Me" (Burton Lane, Alan Jay Lerner) – 2:48
 "Little Boat" (Roberto Menescal, Rolando Boscoli, Buddy Kaye) – 2:36
 "It's Time That You Settled Down" (Neil Sheppard, Ray Fox) – 2:13
 "A Good Thing (Is Hard to Come By)" (Tamiko Jones) – 2:17
 "1-2-3" (Len Barry, John Madara, Dave White) – 2:17
 "Only Yesterday" (Jimmy Wisner) – 2:36
 "Sunny" (Bobby Hebb) – 2:27
 "How Insensitive" (Antônio Carlos Jobim, Vinicius de Moraes, Norman Gimbel) – 2:44
 "Sidewinder" (Lee Morgan) – 3:05 
Recorded in New York City on September 27 (tracks 1, 5, 7 & 11), November 23 (tracks 2, 3 & 6) and December 28 (tracks 4 & 8–10), 1966

Personnel 
Herbie Mann – flute
Tamiko Jones – vocals – with various ensembles including:
Roy Ayers, Gary Burton – vibraphone
Joe Zawinul – piano
Victor Gaskin, Reggie Workman – bass
Everett Barksdale – electric bass
Bruno Carr, Roy McCurdy – drums
Carlos "Patato" Valdes – congas, percussion
Tamiko Jones – vocals
Melba Liston (tracks 9 & 10), Jimmy Wisner (tracks 1, 4, 5, 7, 8 & 11), Joe Zawinul (tracks 2, 3 & 6) – arranger
Technical
Tom Dowd – recording engineer
Haig Adishian – cover design
Jerry Czember – cover illustration

References 

1967 albums
Herbie Mann albums
albums arranged by Melba Liston
Albums produced by Ahmet Ertegun
Atlantic Records albums